The National Council for the Evaluation of Social Development Policy (Spanish: Consejo Nacional de Evaluación de la Política de Desarrollo Social) is a Mexican organization coordinated by the Secretariat of Welfare. CONEVAL is an autonomous constitutional organization with legal personality, own proprietorship, technical and management autonomy.

The creation of CONEVAL has its origins in the creation of the General Law of Social Development (LGDS). The Law obliges this institution to coordinate the actions targeted to the achievement of the National Social Development Policy’s objectives, strategies and priorities. CONEVAL is constituted by the head of the Secretariat of Welfare, six academic researchers chosen by the National Social Development Commission, and an executive secretary in charge of the Council. It issues the evaluation guidelines assigned by the Expenditure Budget Decree in order that dependencies and entities regulate their operating social programs.

The Council uses a multidimensional approach to define, identify, and measure poverty using information generated by the National Institute of Statistics and Geography (INEGI). The multidimensional poverty measurement includes the following indicators:
Current income per capita
Educational gap
Access to health services
Access to social security
Quality and spaces of dwellings
Access to basic services in dwellings
 Access to food
 Degree of social cohesion.

Poverty reports
In February 2021 the CONEVAL reported that the COVID-19 pandemic in Mexico could increase the number of people living below poverty by 8.9 to 9.8 million and extreme poverty by 6.1 to 10.7 million. These are the same levels as a decade earlier.

References

External links
CONEVAL web site (in Spanish)
LEY GENERAL DE DESARROLLO SOCIAL (Law on Social Development, in Spanish)

2005 establishments in Mexico